Harry Blum (18. October 1944 in Lennestadt-Elspe, Sauerland; died 17. March 2000 in Cologne) was a German politician and member of the CDU. On 1. October 1999 he became the first directly elected mayor of Cologne, but he only held that office for six months when he died suddenly in March 2000.

Background and earlier life

Harry Blum was born Johannes Jacob Blum into an Old Colognian family, but the family was evacuated during the war. He received his Abitur at Dreikönigsgymnasium and studied law at the University of Cologne. Blum joined the Christian Democratic Union in 1964 and was a member of the city council since 1984.

Mayor of Cologne

Shortly before his election as mayor he adopted his long-time nickname as official first name and was henceforth Harry Johannes Jacob Blum. As one of his initiatives as councillor and mayor was the implementation of an architectural lighting concept for the city, which helped the city win the city.people.light award 2005.

Legacy 
Harry-Blum-Platz in Cologne's Rheinauhafen is named after him.

References 

1944 births
2000 deaths
People from Lennestadt
Mayors of Cologne
University of Cologne alumni
Christian Democratic Union of Germany politicians